Asterophrys slateri is a species of frog in the family Microhylidae.
It is found in New Guinea.
Its natural habitats are subtropical or tropical moist lowland forests, subtropical or tropical moist montane forests, and heavily degraded former forest.
It is threatened by habitat loss.

References

Microhylidae
Amphibians of Papua New Guinea
Taxonomy articles created by Polbot